This list includes football players who play or played at the Norwegian football club Strømsgodset Toppfotball.

A 
  Alexander Aas
  Mohammed Abu  	
  Abdul-Basit Agouda
  Knut Ahlander
  Pål Henning Albertsen
  Paal Alsaker
  Tor Alsaker-Nøstdal
  Komlan Amewou  	
  Odd Amundsen
  Bjørn Andersen
  Eirik Andersen
  Geir Andersen
  Glenn Andersen
  Svein Andersen
  Mattias Andersson
  Per Årseth
  Stefan Aškovski
  Krister Aunan

B 
  Dmitriy Barannik
  Håvard Beckstrøm
  André Bergdølmo
  Kent Bergersen
  Jo Inge Berget
  Bismark Boateng
  Marius Boldt
  Svein Brandshaug
  Henrik Bredeli
  Simen Brenne
  Jeb Brovsky

C 
  Lars-Gunnar Carlstrand
  Behajdin Celina
  Lee Chapman
  Lars Cramer

D 
  Ronny Deila
  Adama Diomandé
  Arne Dokken
  Kenneth Dokken
  Corey Donoghue
  David Driscoll

E 
  Espen Edvardsen
  Omar Elabdellaoui
  Erik Eriksen
  Arne Erlandsen
  Eivind Evensen
  Vidar Evensen

F 
  Espen Falck
  Samir Fazlagić
  Thomas Finstad
  Jostein Flo
  Iver Fossum
  Francisco Santos
  Ole Friise
  Lars Fuhre

G 
  Christer George
  Thomas Gill
  Stefán Gíslason
  Valur Gíslason
  Mathias Gjerstrøm
  Jakob Glesnes
  Lars Granås
  Karanveer Grewal
  Bjørn Gulden
  Anders Gundersen
  Mads Gundersen
  Veigar Gunnarsson
  Göksel Güvenc
  Gestur Arnar Gylfason

H 
  Erik Hagen
  Rune Hagen
  Bjørn Halvorsen
 Stian Lind Halvorsen
  Mounir Hamoud
  Florent Hanin
  Glenn Hansen
  Vegard Hansen
  André Hanssen
  David Hanssen
  Tor Henriksen
  Mergim Herequi
  Lars Hjelmeseth
  Magnus Hjulstad
  Jan Erik Holmen
  Robert Holmen
  Jørgen Horn
  Andreas Hoven
  Kristoffer Hoven
  Marius Høibråten
  Tommy Høiland
  Keijo Huusko

I 
  Abdisalam Ibrahim
  Sunday Ibrahim
  Kåre Ingebrigtsen

J 
  Łukasz Jarosiński
  Aleksandrs Jelisejevs
  Garðar Jóhannsson
  Jim Johansen
  Sondre Johansen
  Stefan Johansen
  Erland Johnsen
  Espen Johnsen
  Bassel Jradi

K 
  Einar Kalsæg
  Ola Kamara
  Helge Karlsen
  Kenneth Karlsen
  Flamur Kastrati
  Muhamed Keita
  Morten Kihle
  Jon Knudsen
  Anders Konradsen
  Péter Kovács
  Jan Kristiansen
  Juro Kuvicek
  Enock Kwakwa
  Adam Kwarasey

L 
  Kim Larsen
  Akeem Latifu
  Marek Lemsalu
  Øyvind Leonhardsen
  Peter Lindau
  Christopher Lindquist
  Stefan Lindqvist
  Trond Ludvigsen
  Trygve Lunde
  Kjetil Lundebakken

M 
  Jan Madsen
  Kim Madsen
  Erik Markegård
  Steffen Martinsen
  Arild Mathisen
  Anders Michelsen
  Petter Moen
  Thomas Moen
  Lars Moldskred
  Jason Morrison

N 
  Colin N'Kee
  Divine Naah
  Tokmac Nguen
  David Nielsen
  Fredrik Nordkvelle
  Razak Nuhu
  Alpha Nyan
  Ousmane Nyan
  Kenneth Nysæther
  Vidar Nysæther
  Steffen Nystrøm

O 
  Marvin Ogunjimi
  Stian Ohr
  Jørgen Oland
  Egil Olsen
  Finn Olsen
  Frode Olsen
  Inge André Olsen
  Lasse Olsen
  Patrick Olsen
  Thomas Olsen
  Trond Olsen
  Boureima Ouattara
  Faso Martin Ovenstad
  Hans Erik Ødegaard
  Martin Ødegaard
  Thomas Ødegaard

P 
  Jonathan Parr
  Johnny Pedersen
 Marcus Pedersen
  Steinar Pedersen
  Espen Pettersen
  Ingar Pettersen
  Steinar Pettersen
  Thorodd Presberg

R 
  Sead Ramović
  Hermann Rhoden
  Joel Riddez
  Vidar Riseth
  Petar Rnkovic
  Thomas Røed
  Sverre Rørvik
  Mads Ryghseter

S 
  Ivar Sandvik
  Alfred Sankoh
  Lars Sætra
  Morten Sætra
  Pål Skistad
  Sander Solberg
  Thomas Solvoll
  Kristian Sørli
  Thomas Sørum
  Bjørn Stephansen
  Jarl André Storbæk
  Øyvind Storflor
  Lars Strand
  Vegard Strøm
  Lars Stubhaug
  Rune Sunde
  Ole Amund Sveen
  Tamás Szekeres

T 
  Marco Tagbajumi
  Ibrahima Thiam
  Borger Thomas
  Inge Thun
  Kristoffer Tokstad
  Óskar Hrafn Þorvaldsson

V 
  Gustav Valsvik
  Lars-Christopher Vilsvik

W 
  Thomas Wæhler
  Øyvind Wibe
  Bård Wiggen
  Gustav Wikheim
  Fredrik Winsnes
  Per Rune Wølner

References 

Strømsgodset Toppfotball